Arachnoiditis is an inflammatory condition of the arachnoid mater or 'arachnoid', one of the membranes known as meninges that surround and protect the nerves of the central nervous system, including the brain and spinal cord. The arachnoid can become inflamed because of adverse reactions to chemicals, infection from bacteria or viruses, as the result of direct injury to the spine, chronic compression of spinal nerves, complications from spinal surgery or other invasive spinal procedures, or the accidental intrathecal injection of steroids intended for the epidural space. Inflammation can sometimes lead to the formation of scar tissue and adhesion that can make the spinal nerves "stick" together, a condition where such tissue develops in and between the leptomeninges. The condition is extremely painful, especially when progressing to adhesive arachnoiditis. Another form of the condition is arachnoiditis ossificans, in which the arachnoid becomes ossified, or turns to bone, and is thought to be a late-stage complication of the adhesive form of arachnoiditis.

Signs and symptoms

Arachnoid inflammation can lead to many painful and debilitating symptoms which can vary  greatly in each case, and not all people experience all symptoms. Chronic pain is common, including neuralgia, while numbness and tingling of the extremities can occur with spinal cord involvement, and bowel, bladder, and sexual functioning can be affected if the lower part of the spinal cord is involved. While arachnoiditis has no consistent pattern of symptoms, it frequently affects the nerves that supply the legs and lower back. Many patients experience difficulty sitting for long (or even short) periods of time due to discomfort or pain, or because of efferent neurological or other motor symptoms, such as difficulties controlling limbs. Difficulty sitting can be problematic for patients who have trouble standing or walking for long periods, as wheelchairs are not always helpful in such cases.

Causes
The root cause of the condition is not entirely clear, and it appears to have multiple causes, including iatrogenic cause from misplaced epidural steroid injection therapy when accidentally administered intrathecally (inside the dura mater, the sac enveloping the arachnoid mater), or from contrast media used in myelography prior to the development of metrizamide and other water-soluble contrast agents. Other noninfectious inflammatory processes include surgery, intrathecal hemorrhage, and the administration of anesthetics (e.g. chloroprocaine), and steroids (e.g. prednisolone, triamcinolone acetonide). A variety of other causes exist, including infectious, inflammatory, and neoplastic processes. Infectious causes include bacterial, viral, fungal, and parasitic agents. Prior spinal surgery has been documented as a cause of arachnoiditis ossificans, as well as for the adhesive form. It can also be caused by long term pressure from either a severe disc herniation or spinal stenosis.

Diagnosis
For the ossificans form of the condition, unenhanced CT may better show the presence and extent of arachnoid ossifications, and is complementary to MRI, as MRI can be less specific and findings can be confused with regions of calcification or hemosiderin.

Treatment 
Arachnoiditis is difficult to treat and treatment is generally limited to alleviation of pain and other symptoms. While arachnoiditis may not yet be curable and can be significantly life-altering, management of the condition, including with medication, physical therapy, and if appropriate, psychotherapy, can help patients cope with the difficulties it presents. Surgical intervention generally has a poor outcome and may only provide temporary relief, but some cases of surgical success have been reported. Epidural steroid injections to treat sciatic pain have been linked as a cause of the disease by the U.S. Food and Drug Administration as well as in other research, and are therefore discouraged as a treatment for Arachnoiditis as they will most likely worsen the condition. Some patients benefit from motorized assistance devices such as the Segway or standing wheelchairs, although these types of devices may be beyond the reach of those with limited means. Standing endurance and vibration tolerance are considered before considering such devices in any case.

Prognosis
Arachnoiditis is a chronic disorder with no known cure, and prognosis may be hard to determine because of an unclear correlation between the beginning of the disease and the appearance of symptoms. For many, arachnoiditis is a disabling disease that causes chronic pain and neurological deficits, and may also lead to other spinal cord conditions, such as syringomyelia.

References

Further reading

External links 

 
 
 

Inflammatory diseases of the central nervous system